Wing foiling or wing surfing or winging is a wind propelled water sport that developed from kitesurfing, windsurfing and surfing. The sailor, standing on a board, holds directly onto a wing. It generates both upward force and sideways propulsion and thus moves the board across the water. The recent development of foilboards, which plane very early on a hydrofoil fin and thereby lift off the water producing low friction, represent the ideal complementary hydrodynamic platform for wings. This young sport is poised to become wildly popular.

History

Precursors 

The history of wing foiling begins with the invention of wing surfing dating back to 1981, when aeronautical engineer Jim Drake, the inventor of windsurfing, and Uli Stanciu, European windsurfing pioneer, together invented the first wing. Their patented concept was based on the symmetrical shape of the flying fish. Unlike windsurfing, their wing was hand held and not fixed to the board via a mast.

About the same time a frenchman named Roland Le Bail developed a similar wing design. In the years that followed, new technology was adapted and wings repeatedly came onto the market in different variants. In 1986 a mast borne winged concept called Wind Weapon allowed for high jumps in locations with strong winds, but like the Drake wing, it never caught on commercially. The use of the wings is not exclusively tied to water sports, but are also used for sports on the snow, on the beach or on land. The designations "Skate Sails", "Wind Skates" or "Kite Wings" should be mentioned as milestones in further development. What most of these variants have in common is that they use a stiff frame to stretch the wing, which also acts as handlebars or handles.

The reason for the moderate success of all these developments is a physical one: friction. Wings that are big enough to move a sluggish traditional board (including the rider) have to be big, unwieldy and heavy. Newer lightweight, efficient, inflatable wings offers enough propulsion when combined with foilboards to allow excellent performance characteristics.

Modern form 

Tony Logosz, Slingshot Kiteboarding co-founder & designer, made the first "Slingwing" prototypes in 2011, and used it on a wind foil board with a large, high-lift foil in the Columbia Gorge. In March and April 2018, Hawaiian Flash Austin tested 3.5 m² and 4 m² handheld wings on a SUPfoil in Maui. Inspired by Flash’s success, Ken Winner began working on inflatable wings again and the sport as we know it was born. Duotone started marketing their Ken Winner-designed inflatable wing in the spring of 2019. From the summer 2019, Robby Naish and other kitesurf manufacturers were offering inflatable wings.

Construction 

The young sport is still developing. While older wing models were often stretched and held by means of rods, the influence of kite development is currently becoming increasingly important: The wing is made of light kite fabric, which is stretched by inflatable air tubes. To grip the wing, some brands use struts with hand straps, others use telescopic aluminum poles.

Deployment variants 

In contrast to other sports, the wing is not board-bound: it can be used while riding a surfboard, kiteboard or standup paddle board, but also in combination with a skateboard, snowboard, or even on inline skates. Wingsurfing on boards equipped with a foil is particularly popular, as it is possible to plane with small wings at around 8 knots. Wings come in different sizes; typically the smallest are around 2.2 m2, and the largest around 8 m2.

Organization 
Wing surfing companies have founded an organization for the sport called the Global Wingsports Association (GWA). They have organized a world tour starting in 2021. There are two disciplines: surf-race and surf-freestyle.

Classification in the existing surfing sports 

Technically, but also in terms of application, wingsurfing has numerous similarities to both windsurfing and kitesurfing. For example, the wing is controlled directly instead of using lines, but it still has a similar construction and functionality to a kite. The question of whether wingsurfing is a variation of kitesurfing, windsurfing or a completely independent sport is not just of a theoretical nature: it also concerns, for example, the extent to which kite bans at the spots also apply to wingsurfers.

References 

Individual sports
Boardsports
Water sports
Hydrofoils